Dagonovo  is a village in the municipality of Belitsa, in Blagoevgrad Province, Bulgaria. It is located approximately 8 kilometers east from Belitsa and  85 kilometers southeast from Sofia on the eastern bank of Mesta river. The village is situated less than 1 km east of the secondary road Razlog - Velingrad and on the Septemvri-Dobrinishte narrow gauge line. 

Until 1955 the village was a neighborhood of Babyak. The population is Muslim of pomak origin. There is an elementary school "Petko R. Slaveikov" and a kindergarten. Electricity is provided by aerial wires. Drinking water is supplied from the lake "Ribno". There is a sewage draining system.

Villages in Blagoevgrad Province